Renato Cesarini (11 April 1906 – 24 March 1969) was an Italian-Argentine football player and coach who most notably played for Juventus in Italy as a midfielder or forward. He was a dual international footballer and played for both the Argentina and Italy national teams. While playing for Italy, he was part of the successful runner-up 1931-32 Central European International Cup & gold winning 1933-35 Central European International Cup campaigns.

Playing career

Cesarini was born in Senigallia, near Ancona, in the Italian region of Marche, but when he was only a few months old he and his family emigrated to Buenos Aires, Argentina.

In his early career he played for several clubs around the Buenos Aires area, during the amateur era in Argentine football, most notably Chacarita Juniors.

Cesarini was signed by Italian giants Juventus in 1929, he made his debut against S.S.C. Napoli on 23 March 1930: the game ended in a 2–2 draw. He went on to win five league championships in a row with the club.

In 1936 he returned to the professionalised Argentine league where he won two championships with River Plate. This excellent River Plate team included two young players who would become legends of the game Adolfo Pedernera and José Manuel Moreno. The team was coached by the Hungarian Emerico Hirschel who had a big influence on Cesarini and his teammate Carlos Peucelle which would be put to use in the 1940s as they took charge at the club.

Managerial career
After retiring as a player, Cesarini went on to become a football manager. He coached a number of clubs in Argentina including both Boca Juniors and River Plate. With River he coached one of the greatest teams of all time.

From 1941 to 1947 this River Plate team achieved legendary status: Cesarini was coach from 1941 to 1944 when the level of football was such that they became known as La Maquina (The Machine); the forward line of Moreno, Pedernera, Munoz, Labruna and Lousteau is considered to this day to be the greatest seen in South America. River won Argentine league titles in 1941, and 1942 under La Biblia del fútbol as Cesarini became known for his authority on all matters pertaining to the sport.

He returned to Italy to coach Juventus where he led a team including Sivori, Charles and Boniperti to Serie A success. In the mid sixties he started the underage club of Pumas today one of the top clubs in Mexico. Between 1967 and 1968, he coached the Argentina national team.

Honours
Juventus
Serie A: 1930–31, 1931–32, 1932–33, 1933–34, 1934–35

River Plate
Argentine Primera: 1936, 1937
Copa Aldao: 1936

International 
Italy
 Central European International Cup: 1933-35
 Central European International Cup: Runner-up: 1931-32

Legacy
The Italian expression zona Cesarini ("Cesarini zone," also known as "Montesacro zone") was originated as a reference to Renato Cesarini, who often scored decisive goals during the last minutes of the match (the best example being the Italy 3–2 Hungary match of 13 December 1931 at Stadio Filadelfia of Turin). This expression is still in use today in Italian football and it designates a goal that is scored in the final minutes of a match, namely in zona Cesarini.
Cesarini has a football club and training academy in Argentina named in his honour, it was founded in 1978 by former members of the Argentina national team.

See also
Oriundo

References

External links

 
Biography on the club website 
 
 Zona Cesarini  (archived, 10 April 2008)

1906 births
1969 deaths
People from Senigallia
Association football midfielders
Association football forwards
Italian footballers
Argentine footballers
Dual internationalists (football)
Italy international footballers
Argentina international footballers
Juventus F.C. players
Club Atlético River Plate footballers
Chacarita Juniors footballers
Argentine football managers
Argentine expatriate football managers
Racing Club de Avellaneda managers
Club Atlético River Plate managers
Boca Juniors managers
Club Atlético Huracán managers
Club Atlético Banfield managers
Club Universidad Nacional managers
Argentina national football team managers

Serie A players
Argentine Primera División players
Italian football managers
Italian emigrants to Argentina
Sportspeople from the Province of Ancona
Footballers from Marche